Dumgoyne railway station served the village of Killearn, Stirling, Scotland from 1867 to 1951 on the Blane Valley Railway.

History 
The station was opened on 1 July 1867 as Killearn by the Blane Valley Railway.

The station's name was changed again to Dumgoyne Hill on 1 April 1896 and to Dumgoyne on 28 September 1897.

To the southeast was an engine shed, to the east was the goods yard and shed and to the southeast was the signal box. Glengoyne Distillery was also to the east.

The station was host to a LNER camping coach from 1937 to 1939.

The station closed to passengers on 1 October 1951 and to goods traffic on 5 October 1959.

References

External links 
Dumgoyne station on Railscot
Dumgoyne station, 1997

Disused railway stations in Stirling (council area)
Railway stations in Great Britain opened in 1867
Railway stations in Great Britain closed in 1959
Former North British Railway stations
1867 establishments in Scotland
1959 disestablishments in Scotland